Thomas Scioli is an American comic book artist and writer best known for working in a style similar to Jack Kirby.

Biography
Scioli was born in Philadelphia and moved to Pittsburgh after studying at the University of Pittsburgh in the 1990s.

Scioli's epic sci-fi/fantasy series The Myth of 8-Opus won a 1999 Xeric Grant and attracted mild industry attention, earning him a small part illustrating the Fantastic Four: World's Greatest Comic Magazine miniseries (2001) and ultimately higher-profile projects at Image Comics: the miniseries Freedom Force (2005) and the super-sci-fi-opera epic Gødland (with writer Joe Casey).  Scioli has stated that Gødland is "the best thing out there right now" and that he can imagine staying with the book for the rest of his career.

Scioli has attracted some criticism for the similarity between his art and Jack Kirby's, but he is comfortable with his style:

In 2013, Scioli announced he was leaving comics, but in 2018, he produced Go Bots for IDW.

Scioli was raised in Philadelphia and resides in Pittsburgh, Pennsylvania.

Scioli hosts a pop-culture centric YouTube channel  called The Total Recall Show along with his friend/musician, Matt Zeoli.

Bibliography
Comics work includes:

The Myth of 8-Opus (Creator, A-Okay Comics)
Fantastic Four: World's Greatest Comic Magazine #3 (Contributor, Marvel Comics, August 2001)
Freedom Force #1-6 (with Eric Dieter, Image Comics, January–June 2005)
Gødland #1-37 (with writer Joe Casey, Image Comics, July 2005 – July 2012)
Elephantmen #3 (artist, Image Comics, September 2006)
"Space Smith" (script and art, in Next Issue Project #1, Image Comics, February 2008)
"Teddy and the Yeti" (cover art, Wagon Wheel Comics, April 2010)
Transformers vs G.I. Joe #1-13, #0 (artist and co-writer with John Barber, IDW Comics,  May 2014-March 2017)
American Barbarian (writer and artist, IDW Comics, August 2015)
Gobots #1-5 (writer and artist, IDW Comics, November 21, 2018-March 17, 2019)
Fantastic Four: Grand Design #1-2 (writer and artist, Marvel Comics, December 2019)
Jack Kirby: The Epic Life of the King of Comics (writer and artist, Ten Speed Press, July 2020)

Awards
2008: Nominated for "Best Graphic Album—Reprint" Eisner Award, for Gødland Celestial Edition Book One

Notes

References

External links

 
 Scioli's home page, dedicated to 8-Opus
 Scioli's blog
Total Recall Show.com

Interviews
 Klaehn, Jeffery. Tom Scioli Interview: Gødland and 8-OPUS, POP, February 21, 2009
 Scioli's Myth of 8-Opus, Comicon.com, June 17, 2009

Living people
Year of birth missing (living people)
American biographers
Writers from Philadelphia
Artists from Philadelphia
Writers from Pittsburgh
Artists from Pittsburgh
American writers of Italian descent
20th-century American male writers
21st-century American male writers
20th-century American artists
21st-century American artists
American comics artists
American comics writers